William Anderson (born 1952) is an American author, historian, and lecturer. He is a specialist in the subject of Laura Ingalls Wilder and her times.

His interest in American frontier began after reading Little House on the Prairie. While attending Albion College as an undergraduate student majoring in English and History he worked for the Laura Ingalls Wilder Memorial Society in DeSmet, South Dakota. He is a director of the Laura Ingalls Wilder Home and Museum in Mansfield, Missouri and is a board member of the Wilder Home Association which runs the museum.  He works as a teacher in Michigan.

His many recognitions for writing include the Western History Association's Billington Award, the Robinson award of the South Dakota State Historical Society, National Endowment for the Humanities awards and National Council for the Social Studies. In September 2002, he was invited to the White House for the third of Laura Bush's American Authors Symposia. The First Lady, a former teacher, and librarian assembled scholars, authors, and historians for a conference on the frontier experience.

Works

About the Ingalls and Wilder families  

 The Story of the Ingalls (Mansfield, MO: L.I.W. Home & Museum, 1967), 14 pp., ; revised ed. 1993, 44 pp.,  – booklet
 Laura Wilder of Mansfield (1968); reissued 1974 by the L.I.W. Memorial Society – booklet
 A Wilder in the West: the story of Eliza Jane Wilder (De Smet, SD: L.I.W. Memorial Society, 1971) – booklet
 The Story of the Wilders (L.I.W. Home and Museum, 1973), reissued by the L.I.W. Memorial Society – booklet
 The Ingalls Family Album (L.I.W. Memorial Society, 1973), ; revised 1976,  – 20 and 24 pp. booklets
 Laura's Rose: the story of Rose Wilder Lane (L.I.W. Memorial Society, 1976) – booklet
 The Pepin Story of the Ingalls Family (Pepin, WI: L.I.W. Memorial Society, 1981), 20 pp. – The Story of the Ingalls (1967), revised in Pepin with permission of Anderson, 
 Laura Ingalls Wilder, Pioneer, and Author (New York: Kipling Press, 1987), foreword by Ruth Alexander, 54 pp., 
 The Walnut Grove Story of Laura Ingalls Wilder (Walnut Grove, MN: L.I.W. Museum, 1987) – booklet, 
 Laura Ingalls Wilder: a biography (Harper, 1988); 1992, 
 Little House Country: a photo guide to the home sites of Laura Ingalls Wilder (Kansas City, MO: Terrell Publ., 1989), photos by Leslie A. Kelly – 48 pp., ; Japan: Kyuryudo Art Publ., 1988; Harper, 1990, 119 pp., 
 Laura Ingalls Wilder: the Iowa story (Burr Oak, IA: L.I.W. Park & Museum, 1990) – booklet
 The Little House Guidebook (Harper, 1996), photos by Kelly – 96 pp., ; updated 2002, 
 Pioneer Girl: the story of Laura Ingalls Wilder (Harper, 1996), unpaged picture book, illus. Dan Andreasen, 
 Laura's Album: a remembrance scrapbook of Laura Ingalls Wilder (Harper, 1998) – "photographs and mementos accompany an account of the life and literary career", 
 Prairie Girl: the life of Laura Ingalls Wilder (Harper, 2004), 74 pp., illus. Renée Graef, 
 Laura Ingalls Wilder's Walnut Grove (Walnut Grove, MN: L.I.W. Museum, 2013), 96 pp.,

As editor 
 The Horn Book's Laura Ingalls Wilder: articles about and by Laura Ingalls Wilder, Garth Williams, and the Little House Books (Boston, Horn Book, 1987), 48 pp.,  
 "Laura Ingalls Wilder and the Little House Books", Irene Smith
 "A Tribute to Laura Ingalls Wilder", J.D.L.
 "Illustrating the Little House Books", Garth Williams
 "The Discovery of Laura Ingalls Wilder", Virginia Kirkus – Horn Book Magazine 29 (December 1953): 428–29 
 "Christmas in the Little House Books", Marcia Dalphin
 "Laura's Gingerbread - Recipe"
 "A Letter from Laura Ingalls Wilder"
 A Little House Sampler (U. of Nebraska, 1988), Ingalls Wilder and Wilder Lane, 
 The Laura Ingalls Wilder Country Cookbook (Harper, 1995),  – features recipes from Ingalls Wilder's personal collection, photos by Leslie A. Kelly, 
 A Little House Reader: a collection of writings (Harper, 1998), Ingalls Wilder,

Other books 
 Michigan's Marguerite de Angeli: the story of Lapeer's native author-illustrator (Lapeer, MI: Marguerite de Angeli Library, 1987), 60 pp., 
 The World of Louisa May Alcott: a first-time glimpse into the life and times of Louisa May Alcott, author of "Little Women" (Japan: Kyuryudo Art Publ., 1992; Harper, 1995), 120 pp., photos by David Wade, 
 The World of the Trapp Family: the life story of the legendary family who inspired "The Sound of Music" (Davison, MI: Anderson Publ., 1998), 168 pp., photos by David Wade – distributed by the Trapp Family Lodge, Stowe VT, 
 River Boy: the story of Mark Twain (2002), unpaged picture book, illus. by Dan Andreasen, 
 M is for Mount Rushmore: a South Dakota alphabet (Chelsea, MI: Sleeping Bear Press, 2005), illus. Cheryl Harness, 
 V is for von Trapp: a musical family alphabet (Ann Arbor, MI: Sleeping Bear, 2010), illus. Linda Dockey Graves,

Magazine articles  
Articles by Anderson have appeared in several periodical publications.
 American History Illustrated
 The Christian Science Monitor
 The Horn Book Magazine
 The Saturday Evening Post
 Travel + Leisure

References

External links

 
 
“The House On Rocky Ridge Farm: Preserved, Not Restored.” (Anderson, William. May 26, 2016) Accessed 30 July 2019.
“One More Visit To The Little House: The Selected Letters Of Laura Ingalls Wilder.” (Anderson, William. March 4, 2016)  Accessed 30 July 2019.

1952 births
 American children's writers
 Schoolteachers from Michigan
 Living people
 Date of birth missing (living people)
 Place of birth missing (living people)